Jilin cuisine is the regional cooking style of the Han Chinese with heavy influence from native Manchu, Korean, and Mongolian minorities in the Jilin Province of Northeastern China.

Characteristic features 
Due to short growing seasons and prolonged winters, fermentation is the main method of preserving food. Suan cai is very prominent in Jilin cuisine. The cold winters have also led to the development of a regional brand to hot pot such as Fucha Manchu Hot Pot. The colder climate of Northern China is generally unsuited to grow rice making wheat, buckwheat, and sorghum as the primary sources of starch. The abundance of starch has given rise to staple steamed buns and noodles dishes of the region. Jilin cuisine in unique among Chinese cuisine by extensive consumption of raw seafood and vegetables.

Jilin cuisine is primarily characterized by influences from the three largest minorities of the province.

 Manchu – boiled pork and blood sausages, cold vegetables
 Korean – fermented vegetables, cold noodles
 Mongolian – lamb dishes

The ethnic Han in Jilin cuisine draw influence from Beijing, Shandong, and even Western cuisine. The deep preference and influence of Shandong cuisine come from immigrants who left the province for Jilin during the Qing Dynasty.

Jilin cuisine shares similar dishes with neighboring Heilongjiang and Liaoning provinces being part of the Northeastern Chinese cuisine.

Notable dishes

See also 

 Northeastern Chinese cuisine
 Chinese cuisine
 Korean cuisine
 Manchu cuisine

References 

Chinese cuisine
Regional cuisines of China
Culture in Jilin